Ule is a German surname. It may refer to:

Ernst Heinrich Georg Ule (1854–1915), German botanist and explorer
Otto Eduard Vincenz Ule (1820–1876), German natural science writer
Wilhelm Ule (1861–1940), German geographer and limnologist